This is a list of public art in the London Borough of Tower Hamlets.

Bethnal Green and Globe Town

Bromley-by-Bow

Isle of Dogs

Canary Wharf

Limehouse

Mile End and Bow

Poplar and Blackwall

St Katharine Docks

Shadwell

Spitalfields

Tower Hill

Victoria Park and Hackney Wick

Wapping

Whitechapel and Stepney

See also
 Draped Seated Woman 1957–58 ("Old Flo") by Henry Moore, installed at Cabot Square, Canary Wharf, "for at least five years" from 2017
 List of public art formerly in London for the statue of Robert Milligan (by Richard Westmacott), Faun with Goose (George Ehrlich) and Woman with Fish (Frank Dobson)

References

Bibliography

External links
 

Tower Hamlets
Tower Hamlets
Tourist attractions in the London Borough of Tower Hamlets